Michael Hartmann may refer to:
 Michael Hartmann (footballer) (born 1974), German footballer who played for the national team in 2003
 Michael Hartmann (politician) (born 1963), German politician, member of the Bundestag
 Michael Hartmann (judge) (born 1944), Hong Kong judge from Zimbabwe
 Michael Hartmann (soccer), American association football player
 Mike Hartman, American ice hockey player